Takuo (written: 卓雄, 拓央 or 択生) is a masculine Japanese given name. Notable people with the name include:

, Japanese engineer
, Japanese naval architect, Imperial Japanese Navy admiral and government minister
, Japanese voice actor
, Japanese astronomer
Takuo Miyagishima (1928–2011), Japanese-American design engineer
, Japanese footballer
, Japanese conductor

Japanese masculine given names